Gordon Pryor Eaton (born March 9, 1929) is an American geologist. Eaton was born in Dayton, Ohio. He currently resides in Bryan, Texas, with his wife, Virginia. They have two grown children.

Life and career
Dr. Eaton graduated from Wesleyan University, with high Honors, High Distinction and Phi Beta Kappa and Sigma Xi recognition, with a B.A. in Geology in 1951; received an M.S. in Geology from the California Institute of Technology in 1953; and a Ph.D. in Geology and Geophysics in 1957 from the California Institute of Technology. At Wesleyan he was a member of Delta Upsilon fraternity.

Dr. Eaton held a number of academic positions. Eaton taught as his alma mater from 1955–1959. From 1959 to 1967, he was an assistant professor, associate professor, and chair of the Department of Geological Sciences at University of California, Riverside. From 1986 to 1990, Eaton served as President of Iowa State University.

On March 24, 1994, Dr. Gordon P. Eaton became the 12th Director of the U.S. Geological Survey. From October 1990 to March 1994, he served as the Director of Lamont–Doherty Earth Observatory of Columbia University in Palisades, New York. From 1986 to 1990, Dr. Eaton was President of the Iowa State University in Ames, Iowa. From 1967 to 1981, he held various positions with the U.S. Geological Survey, including Associate Chief Geologist, Reston, Virginia and Scientist-in-charge, Hawaiian Volcano Observatory, Hawaii Volcanoes National Park, Hawaii.

Dr. Eaton is a member of the American Association for the Advancement of Science, the Geological Society of America, and the American Geophysical Union. He is listed in Who's Who in America, Who's Who in the Midwest, Who's Who in the World, Who's Who in Science and Engineering, and American Men and Women of Science. He was a member of committee on the formation of the National Biological Survey, National Research Council. He has also served on the Board on Earth Sciences and Resources and the Ocean Studies Board of the National Research Council.

Awards and honors
 Eaton Hall on the campus of Iowa State University is named for Dr. Eaton.

Publications
 Epeirogeny in the Southern Rocky Mountains region; evidence and originGeosphere, vol. 4, no. 5, pp. 764–784, Oct 2008
 Once a geologist, always a... the path to a university presidency... and back again The Compass, vol.79, no.1, pp. 27–28, 2005
 Disinformation, misinformation, or myths? Geotimes, vol.42, no.8, pp. 5, Aug 1997
 The new U. S. Geological Survey; environment, resources, and the future Environmental Geosciences, vol. 4, no. 1, pp. 3–10, Mar 1997
 The future of national geological surveys; global challenges, global opportunities Renewable Resources Journal, vol.13, no.2, pp. 14–17, 1995
 A tectonic redefinition of the Southern Rocky Mountains Tectonophysics, vol.132, no.1-3, pp. 163–193, 15 Dec 1986
 Recommendations for research in determining the probability of mineral occurrence with Robert G. Garrett. U.S. Geological Survey Circular No. 0980, pp. 278–282, 1986
 Mineral abundance in the North American Cordillera American Scientist, vol.72, no.4, pp. 368–377, Aug 1984
 The Basin and Range Province; origin and tectonic significance Annual Review of Earth and Planetary Sciences, vol.10, pp. 409–440, 1982
 The 1977 eruption of Kilauea Volcano, Hawaii Journal of Volcanology and Geothermal Research, vol.7, no.3-4, pp. 189–210, May 1980

References

Additional sources 
 Iowa State University - Gordon P. Eaton Papers, 1972-1991

External links
Oral history interview with Gordon Eaton on 8 July 1997, American Institute of Physics, Niels Bohr Library & Archives - Session I
Oral history interview with Gordon Eaton on 4 August 1997, American Institute of Physics, Niels Bohr Library & Archives - Session II
Portrait of Gordon Eaton from U.S. Geological Survey Museum Collection
Photograph of Gordon P. Eaton from the U.S. Geological Survey (About USGS: Directors)

American geologists
Presidents of Iowa State University
Wesleyan University alumni
California Institute of Technology alumni
Columbia University faculty
United States Geological Survey personnel
1929 births
Living people
People from Dayton, Ohio